Edward or Eddie O'Hara may also refer to:
 Edward O'Hara (Canadian politician) (died 1833), Canadian politician
 Eddie O'Hara (footballer, born 1927) (1927–1987), Irish professional footballer
 Eddie O'Hara (footballer, born 1935) (1935–2016), Scottish professional footballer
 Eddie O'Hara (politician) (1937–2016), British politician